Granite Creek may refer to:

 Granite Creek (British Columbia), a creek and townsite in British Columbia, Canada
 Granite Creek (Arizona), a tributary of the Verde River in Arizona, United States
 Granite Creek (Black Rock Desert), a stream in Nevada

See also 
 20 Granite Creek, an album of Moby Grape